The 1985 England rugby union tour of New Zealand was a series of seven matches played by the England national rugby union team in New Zealand in May and June 1985. England played seven games, including two test matches against the New Zealand national rugby union team. They won four of the seven matches but lost both of the test matches as well as the fixture against the Auckland provincial team.

The preliminaries to this tour were shrouded in uncertainty and selection
announcements containing players whose availability had not been confirmed. Dick Greenwood, England's current coach, announced he was not available having just taken a new job, and eventually 2 coaches were appointed under Derek Morgan, Martin Green and Brian Ashton. The party as a whole was very short of experience,

Matches
Scores and results list England's points tally first.

Touring party
Manager: Derek Morgan
Assistant manager: Brian Ashton
Coach: Martin Green 
Captain: Paul Dodge (Leicester) 30 caps

Backs

Chris Martin (Bath) 4 caps
Ian Metcalfe (Moseley) No caps
Bryan Barley (Wakefield) 4 caps
Paul Dodge (Leicester) 30 caps
J.M. Goodwin (Moseley) No caps
Mike Harrison (Wakefield) No caps
Jamie Salmon (Harlequins) No caps
Simon Smith (Wasps) 5 caps
Stuart Barnes (Bath) 2 caps
Huw Davies (Wasps) 15 caps
Richard Hill (Bath) 2 caps
Nigel Melville (Wasps) 3 caps

Forwards

Steve Bainbridge (Fylde) 11 caps
Steve Brain (Coventry) 7 caps
David Cooke (Harlequins) 10 caps
Wade Dooley (Preston Grasshoppers) 5 caps
Jon Hall (Bath) 3 caps
Bob Hesford (Bristol) 10 caps
Paul Huntsman (Headingley) No caps
John Orwin (Gloucester) 5 caps
Gary Pearce (Northampton) 21 caps
Malcolm Preedy (Gloucester) 1 cap
Gary Rees (Nottingham) 2 caps
Austin Sheppard (Bristol) 2 caps
Andy Simpson (Sale) No caps
Mike Teague (Gloucester) No caps

England tour
England national rugby union team tours of New Zealand
Eng
tour